Ben Evans (born 30 October 1992), also known by the nickname of "Bev", is a Welsh professional rugby league footballer who plays as a  for the Barrow Raiders in the Betfred Championship and Wales at international level.

He has previously played for the Warrington Wolves in the Super League, and on loan from Warrington at Bradford in the top flight, at the Leigh Centurions in the Championship and the Rochdale Hornets in League 1. Evans has also played for the London Broncos and Toulouse Olympique in the Championship.

Background
Evans was born in Bridgend, Wales.

He is the twin brother of the  rugby league footballer; Rhys Evans.

Warrington Wolves
Ben signed for Warrington Wolves alongside his twin brother Rhys Evans, and progressed through the youth system, appearing for the first-team in several pre-season friendlies but never in a competitive match.

2014
Evans featured in Round 1 (St. Helens) to Round 5 (Salford Red Devils). He then featured in Round 7 (Huddersfield Giants) and then in Round 9 (Widnes Vikings) to Round 17 (Salford Red Devils). Evans featured in Round 4 (Hull Kingston Rovers) to the Quarter Final (Bradford Bulls) in the Challenge Cup. He scored against Hull F.C. (1 try) and Hull Kingston Rovers (1 try).

2015
He featured in Round 2 (Hull F.C.) and then in Round 4 (Hull Kingston Rovers) to Round 6 (St. Helens).

Bradford
In 2013 he was offered the chance to go to another Super League side on loan, Bradford Bulls. Ben signed a 1-year loan deal with Bradford before pre-season started in time for the 2013 season. However, his début was delayed as a hip injury ruled him out for the start of the season. 

He left at the end of the season to return to his parent club Warrington where he has played this season repeatedly and scored 1 try.

London
In 2016, Evans found himself at the bottom of the pecking order at Warrington not playing a Super League game all season. He played 3 games on loan to Leigh Centurions, and also on loan for 2 games for Rochdale Hornets.

On 16 October 2016, Evans signed for the London Broncos for the 2017 season.

International career
Having represented Wales at youth level, in 2012 Ben was called up by the senior squad to play in the 2012 Autumn International Series. He made his international début in a 20-6 defeat by France, and made a further appearance against England that year. He made his international début before making a first-team appearance at club level.

He was selected in Wales 2013 Rugby League World Cup squad. He featured in the 32-16 defeat by Italy and in the 16-24 defeat by the United States. He scored against Italy (1 try).

He was selected in the Wales 9s squad for the 2019 Rugby League World Cup 9s.

Statistics

References

External links

London Broncos profile
(archived by web.archive.org) 2012 Bradford Bulls profile
(archived by web.archive.org) 2014 Profile at warringtonwolves.com
(archived by web.archive.org) Statistics at rlwc2017.com
Wales profile
Welsh profile

1992 births
Living people
Barrow Raiders players
Bradford Bulls players
Leigh Leopards players
London Broncos players
Rochdale Hornets players
Rugby league locks
Rugby league players from Bridgend
Rugby league props
Rugby league second-rows
Toulouse Olympique players
Wales national rugby league team players
Warrington Wolves players
Welsh rugby league players